Courage of Lassie is a 1946 Technicolor MGM feature film starring Elizabeth Taylor, Frank Morgan, and dog actor Pal in a story about a collie named Bill and his young companion, Kathie Merrick. When Bill is separated from Kathie following a vehicular accident, he is trained as a war dog, performs heroically, and, after many tribulations, is eventually reunited with his beloved Kathie.

Courage of Lassie is the third of seven MGM films featuring a canine star called Lassie, based on Eric Knight's fictional character.  Pal, a  male Rough Collie, using the stage name Lassie, appeared as the title character in the first film, Lassie Come Home (1943) and as Laddie in its 1945 sequel, Son of Lassie. Despite this film's title, the character Lassie does not appear in Courage of Lassie; Pal (credited as Lassie) portrays "Bill", also referred to as "Duke" for part of the movie.

Courage of Lassie has been released to VHS and DVD.

Plot
A collie pup is separated from his mother and grows to young adulthood in the forest. After being swept away in a torrent and then shot by a young hunter, he is found by Kathie Merrick (Elizabeth Taylor) and carried to her home. With the help of a kindly shepherd, Mr. MacBain (Frank Morgan), she tends him back to health, names him Bill, and teaches him to herd sheep.

One day, unknown to Kathie, Bill is hit by a truck and taken to an animal hospital. Kathie risks her life futilely searching for him on the island where they first met. Bill remains unclaimed in the hospital for two months and is sent to a War Dog Training Center, where he is referred to as "Duke". After training, he is shipped out with the troops to the Aleutian Islands Campaign. Duke performs heroically on the battlefield, but the stress and a wound cause him to become aggressive. Sent back to the War Dog Training Center to recover, he escapes, attacking livestock and threatening people as he finds his way back to Kathie.

Merricks' neighbors insist he be put down because of his attacks, and Bill is impounded. A hearing is held and Mr. MacBain acts as Bill's lawyer.  He discovers an Army tattoo in Bill's ear; a quick investigation reveals Bill is a war hero. All then realize that the dog who served on the battlefield was not himself after his war experiences, and he will need time to adjust to civilian life. Bill is freed and joyfully reunites with Kathie.

Cast

 Pal (credited as Lassie) as Bill, a rough collie
 Elizabeth Taylor as Katherine Eleanor Merrick, a young girl living on a sheep ranch
 Selena Royle as Mrs. Merrick, her mother 
 Catherine McLeod as Alice Merrick, her sister 
 David Holt as Pete Merrick, her brother
 Frank Morgan as Harry MacBain, a shepherd 
 Tom Drake as Sergeant Smitty, Bills' trainer in the Army 
 Bill Wallace as Sergeant Mac, Smitty's friend 
 Garry Owen as Cook Swenson - Sailor helping Smitty
 Harry Davenport as Judge Payson 
 George Cleveland as Old Man, Bill's original owner 
 Morris Ankrum as Farmer Crews, a Merrick neighbor 
 Mitchell Lewis as Gil Elson, a Merrick neighbor 
 Jane Green as Mrs. Elson, Gil Elson's wife 
 Minor Watson as Sheriff Ed Grayson 
 Donald Curtis as Charlie, a truck driver
 Clancy Cooper as Casey, a truck driver
 Carl Switzer as First Youth, a hunter
 Conrad Binyon as Second Youth, a hunter

Production
The film was shot on location at Railroad Creek by Lake Chelan near Holden, Washington.

The film was copyrighted under the working title Hold High the Torch; another working title was Blue Sierra. Margaret O'Brien and Lionel Barrymore were originally slated for the starring roles, according to The Hollywood Reporter.

Courage of Lassie was fourteen-year-old Elizabeth Taylor's second "Lassie" film; she first had appeared in Lassie Come Home in the minor role of the Duke of Rudling's granddaughter, Priscilla.  Taylor received the first top billing of her career with Courage of Lassie.  George Cleveland, the "Old Man" in the opening scenes of Courage of Lassie would become the star of the 1954 television series Lassie.

Music
In 2010, Film Score Monthly released the complete scores of the seven Lassie feature films released by MGM between 1943 and 1955 as well as Elmer Bernstein's score for It's a Dog's Life (1955) in the CD collection Lassie Come Home: The Canine Cinema Collection, limited to 1000 copies.  
Due to the era when these scores were recorded, nearly half of the music masters have been lost so the scores had to be reconstructed and restored from the best available sources, mainly the Music and Effects tracks as well as monaural ¼″ tapes.

The score for Courage of Lassie was composed by Bronislau Kaper and Scott Bradley, who is well known to score music for MGM's cartoon department.

Track listing for Courage of Lassie (Disc 3)

"Main Title" (David Snell, Kaper, Bradley, Robert Franklyn); "The Lake" (Bradley); "Danger in the Woods" (Bradley) - 4:11 
"The Lost Puppy" (Bradley) - 2:16 
"The Playful Puppy" (Bradley); "The Eagle" (Bradley); "The Fishing Bear" (Bradley); "Fish Jumps" (Nathaniel Shilkret) - 4:49 
"Girl on a Raft" (Bradley); "Fawn and the Raven" (Bradley); "The Puppy Gets Shot" (Franklyn–Bradley) - 5:36 
"Bill Barks" (Kaper); "Hello, Mr. MacBain" (Kaper) - 1:30 
"Nellie" (Kaper); "My Diary" (Kaper) - 2:33 
"Sheep in the Snow" (Mario Castelnuovo-Tedesco); "Rescuing the Sheep" (Castelnuovo-Tedesco) - 4:46 
"It's Bill" (Castelnuovo-Tedesco) - 2:15 
"At the Veterinary's" (Kaper) - 1:04 
"Dog Branded" (Kaper) - 1:05 
"Down, Boy" (Kaper) - 1:09 
"Ship Kitchen" (Kaper); "The Change" (Castelnuovo-Tedesco) - 5:10

Bonus tracks
"Trailer Opening" (Shilkret); "Trailer Finale" (Shilkret) - 1:08 
"Sunrise" (Castelnuovo-Tedesco); "Dog and Puppies" (Castelnuovo-Tedesco); "The Lost Puppy" (first version) (Castelnuovo-Tedesco); "Dog Meets Animals" (Shilkret); "Woodland Animals" (Shilkret); "Fish Jumps" (first version) (Shilkret); "The Owl and the Coyote" (Castelnuovo-Tedesco) - 16:47 
"A Girl, a Dog and a Raven" (Castelnuovo-Tedesco) - 3:37
 
Total Time:  57:83

Reception
The film was popular and earned $2,505,000 in the US and Canada and $1,595,000 elsewhere, making MGM a profit of $968,000.

The New York Times praised the acting of Elizabeth Taylor "refreshingly natural as Lassie's devoted owner, and Frank Morgan, as an elderly confidante," though concluded "it is Lassie's, or Bill's, picture. And, despite some improbabilities in the plot, it is his "acting" and the polychromatic settings which are the chief delights of this offering."

References

External links 
 
 
 
 

1946 films
American war drama films
American children's drama films
1940s English-language films
Films directed by Fred M. Wilcox
Lassie films
Metro-Goldwyn-Mayer films
Films shot in Washington (state)
Films scored by Scott Bradley
Films scored by Bronisław Kaper
Films scored by Nathaniel Shilkret
1940s war drama films
1946 drama films
1940s American films